Marcaim Assembly constituency is one of the 40 Goa Legislative Assembly constituencies of the state of Goa in southern India. Marcaim is also one of the 20 constituencies falling under the South Goa Lok Sabha constituency.

Members of Legislative Assembly

Election results

2022 result

2017

2012 result

2007 result

See also
 List of constituencies of the Goa Legislative Assembly
 North Goa district

Notes

References

External links
  

North Goa district
Assembly constituencies of Goa